Ioan Cunningham (born 1 January 1983) is a Welsh rugby union coach. He was appointed as head coach of the Wales women's national rugby union team in 2021. He has committed up to the 2025 Rugby World Cup.

Career
Cunningham played for Wales under-16, captained the under-18's and under-19's, and also featured for the under-21's teams.

Cunningham played at number 8 and was captain of the Bridgend Ravens. He has also played for Llanelli RFC, Bridgend RFC, Llandovery RFC, and Carmarthen Quins RFC.

Coaching career 
Cunningham was previously the Head Coach of Wales national under-20 team. He was the Scarlets forwards coach from 2015 to 2020.

References

External links
 Bridgend Ravens Profile

Welsh rugby union coaches
1983 births
Welsh rugby union players
Living people